Back to Liberty is a 1927 American silent mystery film directed by Bernard McEveety and starring George Walsh, Edmund Breese and Dorothy Hall.

Cast
 George Walsh as Jimmy Stevens 
 Edmund Breese as Tom Devon / Reginald Briand 
 Dorothy Hall as Floria Briand 
 Jean Del Val as Rudolph Gambier 
 De Sacia Mooers as Nina Burke

References

Bibliography
 Munden, Kenneth White. The American Film Institute Catalog of Motion Pictures Produced in the United States, Part 1. University of California Press, 1997.

External links

1927 films
1927 mystery films
American mystery films
Films directed by Bernard McEveety
American silent feature films
American black-and-white films
1920s English-language films
1920s American films
Silent mystery films